For Whom the Bell Tolls is a song by American rapper J. Cole from his fourth studio album 4 Your Eyez Only (2016). It was written by Cole with production by Elijah Scarlett and Cole himself. It contains an interpolation from "DIVINE", written by Aknostra and Tiad Hilm, as performed by Tiad Hilm.

The song was recorded at the Sheltuh in North Carolina and Electric Lady Studios in New York City. Commercially, the song peaked at number 23 on the Billboard Hot 100 In the United States, peaked just outside the top ten on the Hot R&B/Hip-Hop Songs chart, and reached the top 30 in 20 in other countries.

Background
The title of the song references the 1940 novel "For Whom the Bell Tolls" by Ernest Hemingway. The novel tells the story of Robert Jordan, a young American engaged in guerrilla warfare during the Spanish Civil War. The novel focuses on themes of death and suicide.  "For Whom the Bell Tolls" also features background vocals from Kay Foxx.

Commercial performance
Upon its first week of release, "For Whom the Bell Tolls" debuted at number 23 on the US Billboard Hot 100, and at number 13 on the US Hot R&B/Hip-Hop Songs chart. Outside the United States, "For Whom the Bell Tolls" reached the top 30 in Canada and the top 20 in the United Kingdom.

Charts

Personnel
 J. Cole – lead vocals, additional production
 Elijah Scarlett – Production
 Juro “Mez” Davis – Recording Engineer
 Kay Foxx – Background Vocals
 Gosha Usov – Assistant Engineers
 Beatriz Artola – Assistant Engineers
 CharGaux – String Arrangement
 Nico Segal – Horn Arrangement
 Anthony Ware – Additional Horns
 Theo Croker – Additional Horns
 Nate Fox – Additional Musical Arrangement
 Peter Cottontale – Additional Musical Arrangement

References

2016 songs
J. Cole songs
Songs written by J. Cole